Paul Robert Shirtliff (3 November 1962 – 13 September 2009) was an English footballer who played as a defender in The Football League for Sheffield Wednesday and Northampton Town, but spent the majority of his career in non-league football. He was the younger brother of former Sheffield Wednesday defender Peter Shirtliff.

Like his brother, Paul Shirtliff began his career at Sheffield Wednesday, where he signed a professional contract in November 1980. However, unlike his brother, Paul never became a first-team regular at Hillsborough, and only played a handful of games for the club. In July 1984, he moved to Northampton Town on a free transfer. He spent one season with the Cobblers, playing 29 league games. He then dropped down to non-league level, and signed with Frickley Athletic in August 1985.

Shirtliff spent three seasons with Frickley, playing more than 150 games for the club, and was twice named the club's Supporters' Player of the Year. In 1988, he moved to Boston United for a £12,500 transfer fee. In four years at York Street, Shirtliff played 197 first-team games for the Pilgrims, and scored two goals.

In 1992, Shirtliff moved to Dagenham & Redbridge where he spent one season, and played 33 league games.

Shirtliff died on 13 September 2009, aged 46, due to cancer.

References

1962 births
2009 deaths
People from Hoyland
Sportspeople from Yorkshire
English footballers
England semi-pro international footballers
Association football defenders
Sheffield Wednesday F.C. players
Northampton Town F.C. players
Frickley Athletic F.C. players
Boston United F.C. players
Dagenham & Redbridge F.C. players
Gateshead F.C. players
English Football League players
Northern Premier League players
National League (English football) players
Deaths from cancer in England